Freziera forerorum is a species of plant in the Pentaphylacaceae family. It is endemic to Panama.

References

Endemic flora of Panama
Forerorum
Taxonomy articles created by Polbot

Data deficient plants